Muraena pavonina (whitespot moray) is a moray eel that occurs in the western and eastern Atlantic Ocean. It is found in holes and crevices at depth 2–60 m.

References

pavonina
Fish described in 1845